Carlos Rivera Guerra, better known as Carlos Rivera (born March 15, 1986), is a Mexican singer. He rose to fame by winning the third generation of La Academia. Rivera has released four studio albums and participated in six theatre productions.

Early life 

Rivera was born March 15, 1986, in Huamantla, Tlaxcala, Mexico.

His wit made him a hometown celebrity from a young age, and continued after winning singing competitions and hosting a radio show on Radio Huamantla. His big break came in 2004. After many try-outs and auditions, he garnered a spot in the reality television singing competition La Academia, produced by TV Azteca.

After a series of challenges and critiques, including solos and duets, Rivera won over 80% of the votes from the judges and was crowned the winner for season three. After the win, Rivera was named "Huamantla's Favorite Son", by members of Huamatla's City Council.

Career 

In 2005, he signed with Sony Music and began working on a self-titled album. That year he recorded "Y Si tu Supieras" for the feature film Mar de Sueños. The song was nominated for Best Original Song at the 2006 Diosas de Plata, an annual Mexican award ceremony hosted by the Mexican Film Journalism Association.

While working on the album, Rivera worked in theater. In 2006, he starred in the musical Besame Mucho, and the following year performed in Orgasmos La Comedia. By 2008, at 22 years old, Rivera had become the world's youngest actor to play the male lead in Beauty and the Beast, the first major Broadway-like production produced by Disney in Mexico.

Rivera starred in his fourth theater production, Mamma Mia! in 2009. The project garnered him a nomination in the Best Co-Actor of the Year category by the Association of Journalists Theater.

His second studio album, Mexicano, was recorded in 2010 and like its predecessor, which includes hits like "Te me vas" and "No soy el aire," it was certified gold. The project was produced by Kiko Campos.

The Lion King 
In 2011, Rivera became the first Mexican actor to star in a Disney production outside of Mexico.

Over the next two years, more than a million people saw Rivera in the role of Simba. He sold out approximately 700 shows at the Lope de Vega Theater on the famous Gran Via de Madrid, and won Best New Actor at the 2012 Broadway World Spain Awards.

In 2013, Rivera focused on his last Lion King production and the release of his third studio album, El hubiera no existe. The album, which was certified gold in Mexico, was also released in Spain, Argentina, Venezuela, Central America and Portugal.

El Hubiera No Existe 
El Hubiera No Existe marked the beginning of collaborations with Mario Dom, Franco De Vita, Leonel García and Pablo Preciado. The album produced a hits including "Fascinación," "Solo Tú," "Gracias a ti," "El hubiera no existe," "Por ti," "Que fue de nuestra vida," a duet with De Vita, and "No deben marchitar" with India Martinez.

Rivera's world tour, the "El Hubiera No Existe Tour," produced 60 sold-out shows in cities including Madrid, Barcelona, Valencia, Buenos Aires and Guadalajara.

2014– 

In 2014, Rivera participated as a judge in Spain's version of The Voice. That same year he celebrated 10 years as an artist and released a live album, Con Ustedes... Carlos Rivera En Vivo, recorded during his second performance at the Teatro Metropólitan in Mexico City.

Last year, Rivera joined the Lion King cast again, in Mexico, where the project was the highest grossing in the country's history.

Rivera performed in more than 300 shows from 2015 to 2016, and combined with Spain's production, he acted in over 1,000 theater shows, enjoyed by approximately 1.4 million guests.

He is the only actor in the world to have starred in two original Disney productions of The Lion King, and the only protagonist to record on two soundtracks, as well as participating in the lyric adaptation of the original songs for the Spanish version.

This year, Rivera costarred in the telenovela El hotel de los secretos, produced by Televisa. In February, he released his fourth studio album, Yo Creo, which debuted at number1 in AMPROFON's Top Sales Chart in Mexico and No. 1 on iTunes’ General Chart in Spain.

Rivera recorded a song for the Argentinian soap opera Los ricos no piden permiso.

Rivera has collaborated with artists including the late Juan Gabriel, Maluma, Banda el Recodo, Thalía, José José, Pandora, Reyli Barba, Ana Torroja, Marta Sánchez, Franco De Vita, Ana Carolina and Daniel Boaventura (Brazil), Paulo Gonzo (Portugal), Abel Pintos (Argentina), Laura Pausini (Italy) and India Martínez (Spain).

Filmography

Awards 
 Premios TVyNovelas

 First place in the third generation of La Academia (US$270,000) (2004)
 Award from the teachers' union of Tlaxcala (2005)
Mexican President Enrique Peña Nieto presented Rivera with the Artistic Merit Award at the Premios Antena.

Discography

Studio albums 
 2007: Carlos Rivera
 2010: Mexicano
 2013: El Hubiera No Existe
 2016: Yo Creo
 2018: Guerra
 2020: Si Fuera Mia EP
 2021: Crónicas de una Guerra
 2021: Leyendas Vol. 1

Singles

As lead artist

As featured artist

Theatre
 2006: Bésame Mucho
 2007: Orgasmos La Comedia
 2008: La Bella y la Bestia
 2009: Mamma Mia!
 2011: El Rey León (Spain)
 2015: El Rey León (México)

Notes

References

Sources 
 Profile at the ''La Academia site 
 CarlosRivera.com.mx Official Site 
 CarlosRivera.com.mx/foro Official Forum

External links 
 

1986 births
Living people
21st-century Mexican male singers
21st-century Mexican male actors
21st-century Mexican singers
Mexican tenors
Rivera Guerra
La Academia contestants
La Academia winners
Mexican male television actors
Mexican pop singers